The Edison Awards is an annual awards ceremony since 2009 for people in the Tamil film industry. It is named after the inventor of motion pictures, Sir Thomas Alva Edison. It reaches seven countries with Tamil language television, with the main broadcaster Astro in Malaysia.

The event is mainly organised by its founder J.Selva Kumar and hosted by MyTamilMovie.com. The main sponsors in recent years have been Jet Airways and Videocon.

The show is augmented by talent search analysis, live concerts by professional Tamil playback singers and young emergers and dancers. The awards are given based on People's Choice conceptual, implemented with online voting, SMS voting, and Dial-a-Vote.

Awards

Merit awards
 Best Actor

 Best Actress

 Best Debut Actor

 Best Debut Actress

 Best Male Rising Star

 Best Female Rising Star

 Best Supportive Actor

 Best Supportive Actress

 Best Character (Male)

 Best Character (Female)

 Best Comedian

 Best Child Actor

 Best Villain

 Best Commercial Movie

 Best Romantic Movie

 Best Educational Movie

 Best Patriotic Movie

 Best Thriller Movie

 Award for Daring Role

Technical awards
 Best Music Director

 Best Introduced Music Director

 Best Background Score

 Best Male Playback Singer

 Best Female Playback Singer

 Best Introduced Playback Singer

 Best Lyricist

 Best Director

 Best Debut Director

 Best Art Director

 Best Cinematography

 Best Editor

 Best Producer

 Best Choreographer

 Best Action

 Best PRO (Public Relations Officer)

 Best Folk Song

 Favorite Song

Special awards
 Super Star Rajini Award

 Romantic Hero of the Year

 Young Inspirational Actress

 Lifetime Achievement Award

 Manidha Neyam Award

 Best Actor in a Negative Role

 Extreme Performance - Male

 Extreme Performance - Female

 Enthusiastic Performer - Male

 Enthusiastic Performer - Female

 Protonic Icon Award Director

 Best Retro Actress Award

 Best Overseas Artist

 Best Actress in a Social Awareness Movie

 Best Entertainer of the Year

 Best Overseas Lyricist

References

External links
 
 

Indian film awards
Recurring events established in 2009
Awards established in 2009
Tamil cinema
Tamil film awards
2009 establishments in Tamil Nadu